Douglas Herman Scharenguivel (23 July 1918 — 10 July 1995) was a British-Sri Lankan tennis player.

Scharenguivel grew up in what was then British Ceylon, where he was a junior tennis champion. Post-war he moved to Bristol to complete his studies and found work as a civil engineer, living during this time in the town of Filton.

A Gloucestershire county captain, Scharenguivel reached the singles second round at Wimbledon on three occasions, was a two-time Exmouth Open singles champion and won the West of England Championships in doubles. He won the singles title at Bath every year from 1947 to 1952. In 1953 he was called up to the Ceylon Davis Cup team for the country's debut tournament appearance and played a tie against the Netherlands in Scheveningen.

References

External links
 
 
 

1918 births
1995 deaths
Sri Lankan male tennis players
Tennis people from Gloucestershire
Sri Lankan emigrants to the United Kingdom
People from British Ceylon